Tioga is an extinct town in Huerfano County, in the U.S. state of Colorado. The GNIS classifies it as a populated place.

Description
A post office called Tioga was established in 1907, and remained in operation until 1954. Tioga is a name derived from a Native American language meaning "where it forks".

See also

 List of ghost towns in Colorado

References

External links

Ghost towns in Colorado
Former populated places in Huerfano County, Colorado